Mount Washington State Park is a  parcel perched on the summit of Mount Washington, New Hampshire, the highest peak in the northeastern United States. Summer seasonal amenities include a cafeteria, restrooms, gift shops, the Mount Washington Observatory and its museum. The historic Tip Top House is located adjacent to the summit building and is open (small fee) to visitors from early May to early October. The park is accessible by the Mount Washington Auto Road, the Mount Washington Cog Railway, the Appalachian Trail, or numerous other hiking trails from surrounding trailheads including Pinkham Notch, Crawford Notch and the Cog Railway base station.

The land forming the park was originally given to Dartmouth College in 1951 by the estate of the owner of the Cog Railway. Dartmouth sold  to the State of New Hampshire in 1964 for use as a park and then sold the final  in 2008 for $2.1M, after a long-term broadcasting lease had expired.  A small segment of the summit is still owned by the Cog Railway and used as the upper terminus of the railway.

History
In 1642, Darby Field was the first to climb to the summit of Mount Washington. He supposedly had guidance by local Native Americans.

Construction of the auto road started in 1854. After funds ran out in 1856, the current Mount Washington Summit Road Company completed building it in 1859. It was at that time that summit buildings were erected. The Cog Railway completed construction in 1869. In 1908 a major fire destroyed all of the buildings but one — the Tip Top House.

References

External links

 New Hampshire Department of Natural and Cultural Resources

State parks of New Hampshire
State parks of the Appalachians
State Park
Parks in Coös County, New Hampshire
Protected areas established in 1964
1964 establishments in New Hampshire